The Live and Work in Maine Open was a golf tournament on the Korn Ferry Tour. It was first played in June 2021 at Falmouth Country Club in Falmouth, Maine; it had been scheduled to be played in 2020, but was canceled due to the COVID-19 pandemic.

Winners

Bolded golfers graduated to the PGA Tour via the Korn Ferry Tour regular-season money list.

References

External links
Coverage on the Korn Ferry Tour's official site

Former Korn Ferry Tour events
Golf in Maine
Falmouth, Maine
Recurring sporting events established in 2020
Recurring sporting events disestablished in 2022
2020 establishments in Maine
2022 disestablishments in Maine